An Electress was the consort of a Prince-elector of the Holy Roman Empire, one of the Empire's greatest princes.

The Golden Bull of 1356 established by Emperor Charles IV settled the number of Electors at seven.  However, three of these were Roman Catholic archbishops, and so had no consorts; while of the four secular Electors, one was King of Bohemia, and his consort was always known by the more prestigious title of "Queen of Bohemia".  The consorts usually referred to as Electresses, therefore, were:

 The Electress of the Palatinate;
 The Electress of Saxony;
 The Electress of Brandenburg.

To these were added, in 1623 and 1692 respectively:
 The Electress of Bavaria;
 The Electress of Hanover.

In the final years of the Empire, several Electors were added, who only held their offices for less than three years before the Empire's final dissolution.  The consorts of these last Electors were:
 The Electress of Württemberg;
 The Electress of Hesse-Kassel.

There was also an Elector of Baden, but the only ruler to use this title was married morganatically and so his spouse did not share his title.

The rulers of Hesse-Kassel continued to use the title of "Elector" until the annexation of the principality by Prussia in 1866.

Persons using or entitled to use the title of "Electress" are listed below.  Spouses of Electors in morganatic or unequal marriages are given in a separate table at the bottom of the page.

Electresses

Electresses of the Palatinate

Electresses of Saxony

Electresses of Brandenburg

Electresses Palatine (junior line)

Electresses of Bavaria

Electresses of Hanover

Electresses of Württemberg and Hesse

Morganatic spouses of Electors

Notes